Zahid Hasan (born 4 October 1965) is a Bangladeshi film, television and stage actor. He has been working as an actor in the show business arena of Bangladesh since the 1990s. He is also a TV commercial model. He was awarded Bangladesh National Film Award for Best Actor for his performance in the film Srabon Megher Din (1999).

Career
Hasan was part of a theatre group for several years before moving to television in 1990. He took the lead in the BTV adaptation of Rabindranath Tagore's Shomapti and the protagonist in Bichchhu. While he made his first film appearance in 1986, his most notable role was in 2000's Srabon Megher Din, for which he won a National Award. In addition to acting, he has directed several serials and teleplays.

Personal life
Hasan is married to Sadia Islam Mou, a Bangladeshi model and dancer. Together they have a daughter and a son. Hasan has a production house named Pushpita Visuals.

Works

Television 
Hasan is well known for his comedic roles in television drama plays and serials. His debut drama, Jibon Jemon was telecast in 1990. He performed in the drama serial Graduate. He has acted in more than 80 television dramas.

Actor

Director

Other television appearances

Film

Music videos

Awards and nominations

References

External links
  
Zahid Hasan on Facebook
 Zahid Hasan at the Bangla Movie Database

Living people
1967 births
People from Sirajganj District
Bangladeshi male film actors
Bangladeshi male television actors
Bangladeshi television directors
Best Actor National Film Award (Bangladesh) winners
Best Performance in a Negative Role National Film Award (Bangladesh) winners
Best TV Actor Meril-Prothom Alo Award winners
Fellows of the American Physical Society